Leslie Arthur Copeland (born 23 April 1988 in Tavua, Fiji) is a javelin thrower from Fiji. His father died when he was nine, but his father's sister aided him in getting an education. He attended Marist Brothers High School and later became a champion thrower. He represented Fiji at the 2012 Summer Olympics. At the 2012 Olympics, he was one place away from making the final. He represented Fiji at the 2011 and 2013 World Championships.  In the javelin throw event, he ranked 13th with a seasonal best mark but did not advance to the final. In 2016, he threw a personal best throw of 81.76m in Sydney, Australia.

Personal best
Javelin throw: 81.76m NR – Sydney, 2016

Achievements

Seasonal bests by year
2006 - 73.13
2007 - 69.84
2008 - 74.40
2009 - 76.93
2010 - 76.95
2011 - 80.45
2012 - 80.19
2013 - 76.87
2014 - 76.10
2016 - 81.76

References

External links

Fijian javelin throwers
Olympic athletes of Fiji
Athletes (track and field) at the 2012 Summer Olympics
Athletes (track and field) at the 2016 Summer Olympics
1988 births
Living people
People from Tavua, Fiji
People educated at Marist Brothers High School, Fiji
Athletes (track and field) at the 2014 Commonwealth Games
Male javelin throwers
World Athletics Championships athletes for Fiji
Commonwealth Games competitors for Fiji
Fijian male athletes
Fijian people of British descent
Oceanian Athletics Championships winners